"The Curious Republic of Gondour" is a short story by Mark Twain. Twain proposed a state in which all citizens have at least one vote, but where further votes (up to a dozen) could be acquired through education, which was provided by the state for free, or by relative wealth. Furthermore, no one was accepted to any public office without passing strenuous competitive examinations.

Heinlein's Expanded Universe discusses the book, and spells it as Gondor.

Nevil Shute uses the idea of multiple votes according to attainment in his novel In the Wet.

References

External links

 

Mark Twain
Short stories by Mark Twain